Charles John Daniels (born 7 September 1986) is an English former professional footballer who played as a defender. 

Starting his career at Tottenham Hotspur, he experienced a number of loans before joining Leyton Orient. In 2012, he was signed by AFC Bournemouth, where he experienced promotion from League One and the Championship, staying with the club for the duration of the first spell in the Premier League. He finished his career with spells at Shrewsbury Town, Portsmouth and Colchester United. He is currently under 18s coach at Watford.

Career

Early career
Daniels was born in Harlow, Essex, and grew up in nearby Waltham Forest where he attended Highams Park School. He started his career playing for youth club Ridgeway Rovers and Interwood then moved onto Norwich City before joining Tottenham Hotspur's youth academy. He worked his way up through to the reserves, before earning his first professional contract in July 2005.

Daniels spent time on loan at Chesterfield during the 2006–07 season, but sustained an injury in only his second game, and returned to Tottenham.

In the summer of 2007, Leyton Orient boss, Martin Ling signed Daniels on loan for the entire League One season, after watching him regularly in the Tottenham reserves.

Following his last game at Orient, Daniels was sent back to Tottenham, where he had a year remaining on his contract. In August 2008, he joined Gillingham on a one-month loan. He made his debut for Gillingham in a 1–0 home win over Accrington Stanley and scored his only goal for the club with a free kick in a 3–0 home win over Grimsby Town. Daniels then returned to Spurs at the end of September and expressed an interest in trying to break into the first team.

Daniels returned to Orient in the January transfer window of 2009 on a free transfer.

AFC Bournemouth
In November 2011, Daniels joined AFC Bournemouth, initially on a loan deal as the signing was outside of the transfer window, but with the deal to become permanent in the January 2012 transfer window with the contract lasting for three years. On 8 August 2017, Daniels extended his contract with the club for a further three years. On 29 August 2019, Daniels was stretchered off in the 37th minute of Bournemouth's defeat to Manchester City with a dislocated right patella and ruled out for the rest of the season.

Shrewsbury Town
On 23 October 2020, Daniels signed for League One side Shrewsbury Town on a short-term deal until January 2021. He scored his first goal for the club in an FA Cup tie against Cambridge United on 7 November 2020. His first league goal followed on 12 December, the only goal of a 1–0 win away at league leaders Hull City at the KCOM Stadium.

Daniels, alongside former Bournemouth teammate Marc Pugh, left the club on 19 January 2021 after his contract expired.

Portsmouth
On 23 January 2021, Daniels joined League One side Portsmouth on a deal until the end of the 2020–21 season. He scored his first goal for the club on 10 April 2021 in a 2–1 defeat to Burton Albion.

Colchester United and retirement
On 17 August 2021, Daniels signed for League Two side Colchester United on a one-year deal, having been on trial at the club. He made his debut the same day from the substitutes bench in Colchester's 1–1 draw with Mansfield Town. While at Colchester, Daniels began coaching with Watford's under-18 side in a part-time capacity. In January 2022, following the departure of Hayden Mullins as Colchester head coach, he made the decision to retire from playing and concentrate on his coaching role.

Career statistics

Honours
AFC Bournemouth
Football League One runner-up: 2012–13
Football League Championship: 2014–15

Individual
PFA Team of the Year: 2012–13 League One
Premier League Goal of the Month: August 2017

References

External links

1986 births
Living people
Sportspeople from Harlow
English footballers
Association football defenders
Tottenham Hotspur F.C. players
Chesterfield F.C. players
Leyton Orient F.C. players
Gillingham F.C. players
AFC Bournemouth players
Shrewsbury Town F.C. players
Portsmouth F.C. players
Colchester United F.C. players
English Football League players
Premier League players
Watford F.C. non-playing staff